Stéphane Ceretti (born 24 September 1973) is a French visual effects supervisor.

Career 

He began his career first as an animator then as a VFX supervisor at BUF Compagnie in Paris. He moved to London, UK in 2008 where he worked at Moving Picture Company and Method Studios. In 2013, Ceretti moved to the Los Angeles area, where he now lives and works when he is not on film sets.

In 2014, he worked on Guardians of the Galaxy as the Marvel Visual Effects Supervisor.
With Nicolas Aithadi, Jonathan Fawkner and Paul Corbould they were nominated at the 87th Academy Awards for the Best Achievement in Visual Effects and at the 68th British Academy Film Awards for Special Visual Effects.

In 2016, he worked on Doctor Strange as the Marvel Visual Effects Supervisor.
With Richard Bluff, Vincent Cirelli and Paul Corbould they were nominated at the 89th Academy Awards for the Best Achievement in Visual Effects and at the 70th British Academy Film Awards for Special Visual Effects.

In 2017, Ceretti directed and co-produced with Nhut Le a short "Comfort". The short earned an Award of Merit at the Best Shorts competition in September 2017.

In 2018, Ceretti worked on Ant-Man and the Wasp as the Marvel Visual Effects Supervisor while in 2019, he was Visual Effects Supervisor for the additional second unit on Avengers: Endgame alongside Jesse James Chisholm.

In 2019–2020, Ceretti worked on Eternals as Visual Effects Supervisor.

As of Summer 2021, Ceretti is working on Guardians of the Galaxy Vol. 3.

Filmography

References

External links

Living people
1973 births
Special effects people